Épernay station (French: Gare d'Épernay) is the railway station serving the town Épernay, Marne department, northern France. It is situated on the Paris–Strasbourg railway and the Épernay–Reims railway. It is served by TER Grand Est regional trains towards Reims, Paris and Châlons-en-Champagne.

References

External links
 

Railway stations in Marne (department)
Railway stations in France opened in 1849